Declan Quinn (born 1957) is an American cinematographer. He is a three-time winner of the Independent Spirit Award for Best Cinematography.

Early life
Born and raised in Chicago, Illinois, Quinn is one of four children. His mother, Teresa, was a homemaker, and also worked as a bookkeeper and in the travel business, and his father, Michael Quinn, was a professor of literature. His four siblings, the most famous of whom is Aidan, are actors. The family moved to Ireland when he was in his teens, but he returned to the United States to earn a degree in film from Columbia College Chicago.

Career
In Ireland, he met Bono and U2 at the Windmill Lane Studios in Dublin, and he began his career filming several music videos and the documentaries U2: Unforgettable Fire (1984) and U2: Outside It's America (1987) for the group.

Quinn permanently returned to the States in 1989 and filmed The Kill-Off.

In 1991, he served as cinematographer on Tim Hunter's well-received Lies of the Twins, starring Isabella Rossellini, Iman, and Declan's brother Aidan.

Quinn has collaborated with director Mira Nair on five projects, including Kama Sutra: A Tale of Love, Monsoon Wedding, Vanity Fair, and Hysterical Blindness, which earned him a nomination for the Emmy Award for Best Cinematography for a Miniseries or Movie. Additional credits include 2x4, (which won him the Cinematography Award at the 1998 Sundance Film Festival), Vanya on 42nd Street, Leaving Las Vegas, One True Thing, In America, Cold Creek Manor,  The Lucky Ones, Rachel Getting Married, The Private Lives of Pippa Lee and The Reluctant Fundamentalist (2012).

Personal life
Quinn resides in Orange County, New York with his wife Etta and four daughters.

Filmography

Films
 Desperately Seeking Susan (1985)
 The Kill-Off (1989)
 Blood and Concrete (1991)
 Freddy's Dead: The Final Nightmare (1991)
 The Ballad of Little Jo (1993)
 Vanya on 42nd Street (1994)
 Leaving Las Vegas (1995)
 Kama Sutra: A Tale of Love (1996)
 Carried Away (1996)
 One Night Stand (1997)
 One True Thing (1998)
 2by4 (1998)
 This Is My Father (1998)
 Flawless (1999)
 28 Days (2000)
 Monsoon Wedding (2001)
 11'09"01 September 11 (2002)
 In America (2002)
 Cold Creek Manor (2003)
 Vanity Fair (2004)
 Get Rich or Die Tryin' (2005)
 Breakfast on Pluto (2005)
 The Lucky Ones (2007)
 Man from Plains (2007)
 Pride and Glory (2008)
 New York, I Love You (2008)
 Rachel Getting Married (2008)
 The Private Lives of Pippa Lee (2009)
 The Moth Diaries (2011)
 Neil Young Journeys (2011)
 Being Flynn (2012)
 The Reluctant Fundamentalist (2012)
 A Master Builder (2013)
 Admission (2013)
 Hot Tub Time Machine 2 (2015)
 Ricki and the Flash (2015)
 The Shack (2017)
 Otherhood (2019)
 Sylvie's Love (2020)
 Better Nate Than Ever (2022)

Filmed stage productions
 Rent: Filmed Live on Broadway (2008)
 Shrek The Musical (2013)
 Hamilton (2020)

Television films
 Lies of the Twins (1991)
 The Heart of Justice (1992)

References

External links
 
 

1957 births
American cinematographers
American people of Irish descent
Artists from Chicago
Columbia College Chicago alumni
Independent Spirit Award winners
Living people